Patrick G. Flannigan (4 August 1909 – 22 September 1987) was a Scottish professional footballer who played as a defender.

Career
Born in Cowdenbeath, Flannigan played for Kelty Rangers, Cowdenbeath, Lochgelly United, Liverpool, Bradford City, New York Giants and Rosyth Dockyard.

For Bradford City he made one appearance in the Football League. In the United States, he won the American Soccer League championship in 1931 (Spring section and overall title).

His brother was fellow player David Flannigan; their sister Ellen married William Callaghan, several of whose descendents (Willie, Tommy, Willie Jr, Tommy Jr and Liam) also became footballers.

Sources

References

1909 births
1987 deaths
Scottish footballers
People from Cowdenbeath
Footballers from Fife
Scottish expatriate footballers
Scottish expatriate sportspeople in the United States
Expatriate soccer players in the United States
American Soccer League (1921–1933) players
New York Giants (soccer, 1930–1932) players
Cowdenbeath F.C. players
Lochgelly United F.C. players
Liverpool F.C. players
Bradford City A.F.C. players
English Football League players
Association football defenders
Scottish Junior Football Association players
Scottish Football League players
Scottish emigrants to the United States